Sainik School Ambikapur is one of the 24 Sainik Schools of India.  It is a purely residential school for boys.  The medium of instruction is English.  Established by Government of India on 1 September 2008 at Ambikapur. It is affiliated to Central Board of Secondary Education and is a member of Indian Public Schools Conference (IPSC).

The school prepares boys for entry into the National Defence Academy, Khadakwasla, Pune and for other walks of life.

Administration 
The administration of Sainik School is vested in an autonomous body known as Sainik Schools Society under Ministry of Defence, India. Sainik Schools Society is headed by the Board of Governors under the Chairmanship of Raksha Mantri (Union Minister of Defense). The Chief Ministers/Education Ministers of the states where the Sainik Schools are located, are members of the Board of Governors. There is a Local Board of Administration for each school with a senior defense service officer as its Chairman.

Campus 
Sainik School Ambikapur is currently running in its permanent location in Mendrakalan, Post- Bhitthikalan.

Admissions
Admissions are given in Class VI and Class IX. Admission for classes VI and IX is carried out on the basis of an entrance exam usually held in January.

 Sale of Admission Form : During the month of October to December
 Last date of Submission of Admission form : First week of December
 Date of Entrance exam : First Sunday of January

N.C.C.
N.C.C. is an integral part of students' life in Sainik School Ambikapur. The School has an Independent Company of Junior and Senior Division N.C.C. as integral part. N.C.C. unit of school comprises all the three wings of defence services i.e. the Army, Navy and Air Force.

See also
Education in India
Literacy in India
List of institutions of higher education in Chhattisgarh
Education in Chhattisgarh

References

External links 
 http://www.sainikschoolambikapur.org.in
 Sainik Schools Society

Sainik schools
Schools in Chhattisgarh
Surguja district
Educational institutions established in 2008
2008 establishments in Chhattisgarh